Eyne is a commune in the Pyrénées-Orientales department in southern France.

Geography

Localization 
Eyne is located in the canton of Les Pyrénées catalanes and in the arrondissement of Prades.

Population

Sites of interest 
 Jardin ethnobotanique d'Eyne

See also
Communes of the Pyrénées-Orientales department

References
 Municipis Cerdanya: Eina (Catalan)

Communes of Pyrénées-Orientales